Ahar is a city in East Azerbaijan Province, Iran

Ahar may also refer to:

Ahar County, an administrative subdivision in East Azerbaijan Province, Iran
Ahar, Tehran, a village in Tehran Province
Ahar, Uttar Pradesh, a town in Uttar Pradesh, India
Ahar, Rajasthan, a village in Rajasthan, India
Ahar (caste), an Indian caste

People with the surname
Jimmy Anak Ahar (born 1981), Bruneian middle-distance runner